Adam Tangata (born 17 March 1991) is a Cook Islands professional rugby league footballer who plays as a  for the Halifax Panthers in the RFL Championship and the Cook Islands at international level.

He has previously played for Halifax in two separate spells as well as Wakefield Trinity and the Widnes Vikings. Tangata spent time during his second spell at 'Fax on loan at Wakefield in the Super League.

Background
Tangata was born in Raratonga, Cook Islands. His surname Tangata translates to mean people from Polynesian languages.

Career
He has played for the Mount Pritchard Mounties in the NSW Cup and he also played for the Canberra Raiders Under 20s side in 2011.

Adam signed for English semi-professional club Halifax for the 2015 season, on a two-year contract.

Adam is known for his aggressive tackling and hit-ups, and has become a fans' favourite at Halifax. He has his own chant - "ooh aah Tangata".

Halifax Panthers
On 13 Apr 2021 it was reported that he had re-signed for the Halifax Panthers in the RFL Championship on a deal that will keep him at the club until 2022.

International career
He represented his nation in the 2013 Rugby League World Cup.

Adam was named in the Cook Islands squad for the 2017 Rugby League World Cup qualifying match against Tonga.

References

External links
Wakefield Trinity profile
SL profile
Halifax profile
Tangata back for 2020!

1991 births
Living people
Cook Island emigrants to Australia
Cook Island rugby league players
Cook Island sportspeople
Cook Islands national rugby league team players
Halifax R.L.F.C. players
Mount Pritchard Mounties players
Rugby league props
Wakefield Trinity players
Widnes Vikings players